Qatra was a Palestinian Arab village in the Ramle Subdistrict, located  southwest of the city of Ramla and  west of Jerusalem, some  above sea level. It was depopulated in May 1948.

History
Qatra was a Canaanite center of political and economic authority that along with 30 other urban sites in regions bordering the Mediterranean Sea, entered a period of decline in the Late Bronze Age between 1250 and 1150 BCE. Qatra is also tentatively identified with the Hellenistic city of Kidron (Cidron, Gedrus) mentioned in the first Book of the Maccabees (15:39, 41; 16:9), and it has been postulated that its name derives from the Hebrew name for Kidron, Qiṭrôn.

Qatra has been named as the place of origin of a holy man named Sheikh Ahmad al-Qatrawani, who set out from the village  due to his inability to fulfill his religious duties there, and settled by 'Atara, where  his Mamluk shrine still stands.

Ottoman era
In 1596, Qatra was part of the Ottoman Empire, nahiya (subdistrict) of Gaza under the liwa' (district) of Gaza with a population of 46 families and 15 bachelors, an estimated 336 person, all  Muslim. They paid a fixed tax-rate of 25 % on agricultural products,  including wheat, barley, sesame, and fruit, as well as goats and beehives; a total of 11,340 akçe. 1/6 of the revenue went to a waqf.

In 1838, Kutrah was noted as a Muslim village in the Gaza district.

In 1863, Victor Guérin noted  the village to have 600 inhabitants, and with houses of adobe. He further noted a noria by the well, which he assumed to be ancient. By the well were also six sections of barrels of columns of gray marble, the diameter of which was thirty centimetres. The villagers told Guérin they had "always" been there. Hedges of cacti surrounded the village and served as fences for figs and olive trees. There were also several "magnificent" acacias and mimosas there.  

An Ottoman village list of about 1870 showed that  Katra  had a population of 353, in 161  houses, though the population count included men only. It was also noted that it was located south east of Yibna.   

In 1882, the PEF's Survey of Western Palestine (SWP)  described  the village as being built of adobe brick and surrounded by gardens.

British Mandate era
In the 1922 census of Palestine conducted  by the British Mandate authorities, Qatra Islam had a population of 640; 639  Muslims  and 1 Orthodox Christian increasing in the 1931 census to 822, all Muslims, in a total of 175 houses.

During its existence as a village in the British Mandate of Palestine it was referred to as Qatrat Islam to distinguish it from the Jewish settlement of Qatrat Yahud or Gedera, as it is called in Hebrew, established in the late 19th century.

In the 1945 statistics the population was 1,290, all Muslims,  while the total land area was 7,853  dunams, according to an official land and population survey. Of this, Arabs used 291 dunams for citrus and bananas, 215 dunums were irrigated or used for orchards, 4,320 dunums were allocated to cereals, while 26 dunams were classified as built-up urban areas.

1948, and aftermath
Qatra was captured by Israel's Givati Brigade in May 1948. The operation was according to Plan Dalet. Plan Dalets guidelines to the Givati Brigade gave its leader, Lt. Col. Shimon Avidan, wide discretion. In order to "stabilise" his lines, the plan stated that ´you will determine alone, in consultations with your Arab affairs advisers and Intelligence Service officers, [which] villages in your zone should be occupied, cleansed or destroyed.´ During May to early June, Avidan moved to expand his area of control westwards and southwards as part of Operation Barak.

It was during these operations that they encountered the village of Qatra. The village offered no resistance. The Givati troops entered and conducted an arms collection operation on 5–6 May. About 60 weapons were handed over - but a Jewish officer was shot and killed (either by an Arab or by friendly fire) while searching one of the houses. Three Arabs were then taken hostage and Givati demanded the name of the killer, and the handover of any foreign irregulars and additional weapons. The Haganah reoccupied the village and its entire population were either intimidated into flight or expelled on 17 May. The IDF trucked about 200 refugees staying in Majdal, originally from Qatra, towards Ramla in the summer of 1950.

The operation in Qatra (and a similar operation in the nearby village of Aqir) was characterised by looting and brutal behaviour. The HIS officer who accompanied the troops later highlighted several problems, including the lack of clear orders regarding behaviour, the absence of POW camp for detainees, and looting. The Givati Brigade's official history states that after these operations, the brigade HQ acted to ´curtail the instinct to loot and maltreat prisoners [hit´alelut beshvuyim]´.

In 1949, the Israeli moshav of Kidron was established on Qatra's land. The current Israeli towns built on Qatra's land are Gedera and Kidron.

See also
 Barid, Muslim postal network strengthened in Palestine during the Mamluk period (roads, bridges, khans); Qatra was a barid station
 Depopulated Palestinian locations in Israel

References

Bibliography

 (p. 90 notes 37, 38)

  (pp.  269, 288, n. 5)

External links
Welcome To Qatra
Qatra,  Zochrot
Survey of Western Palestine, Map 16:   IAA, Wikimedia commons
Qatra from Khalil Sakakini Cultural Center

Arab villages depopulated prior to the 1948 Arab–Israeli War
District of Ramla